David Wheatcroft Cory  (born 3 August 1928) was a member of the Queensland Legislative Assembly.

Biography
Cory was born in Warwick, Queensland, the son of Fitzroy Cory and his wife Margaret (née Wheatcroft). He was educated at Warwick Central and Intermediate State Schools before attending the Brisbane Grammar School. He became a farmer, working in Swanfels and Warwick.

On 30 June 1967, Cory married Ms Barnes and together had one son.

Public life
Following the death of Otto Madsen in 1963, Cory won the resulting by-election for the Country Party. He held the seat until the 1977 Queensland state elections when he retired from politics.

Although never a minister during his time in parliament, he held the following roles:
 Member of the Parliamentary Refreshment Room Committee – 1967–1977 
 Member of the Government Party Committees on Justice, Primary Industries, Transport, and Lands and Forestry – 1969–1972
 Queensland Delegate to the General Conference of the Commonwealth Parliamentary Association in Canberra – 1970
 Queensland Delegate to the General Conference of the Commonwealth Parliamentary Association in Kuala Lumpur – 1971
 Member of the Government Party Committees on Development and Industrial Affairs, Primary Industries, and Transport – 1972–1974
 Delegate to the Australian Constitutional Convention – 1972 and 1973 
 Member of the Queensland Parliamentary Delegation to Japan and South-East Asia – 1973
 Member of the Queensland Trade Delegation to the Middle East – 1975

He was also Chairman of the Warwick Branch of the Graziers Association of South-East Queensland from 1961 to 1965.

Cory was made a Member of the Order of Australia (AM) in the 2004 Australia Day Honours for "service to the environment, particularly in the areas of rural lands protection in Queensland, and through animal, weed and pest management".

References

Members of the Queensland Legislative Assembly
1928 births
National Party of Australia members of the Parliament of Queensland
Living people
Members of the Order of Australia